In statistics, generalized least squares (GLS) is a technique for estimating the unknown parameters in a linear regression model when there is a certain degree of correlation between the residuals in a regression model. In these cases, ordinary least squares and weighted least squares can be statistically inefficient, or even give misleading inferences. GLS was first described by Alexander Aitken in 1936.

Method outline 
In standard linear regression models we observe data  on n statistical units. The response values are placed in a vector , and the predictor values are placed in the design matrix , where  is a vector of the k predictor variables (including a constant) for the ith unit. This is usually written as
 
Here  is a vector of unknown constants (known as “regression coefficients”) that must be estimated from the data.

Then the residual vector for  will be . The generalized least squares method estimates  by minimizing the squared Mahalanobis length of this residual vector:
 

where the last two terms evaluate to scalars, resulting in
 

 

Therefore, the minimum of the objective function can be computed yielding the explicit formula:
 
The quantity  is known as the precision matrix (or dispersion matrix), a generalization of the diagonal weight matrix.

Properties 
GLS is equivalent to applying ordinary least squares to a linearly transformed version of the data. To see this, factor , for instance using the Cholesky decomposition. In this model , where  is the identity matrix. Thus we can efficiently estimate  by applying Ordinary least squares (OLS) to the transformed data, which requires minimizing

 

This has the effect of standardizing the scale of the errors and “de-correlating” them. Since OLS is applied to data with homoscedastic errors, the Gauss–Markov theorem applies, and therefore the GLS estimate is the best linear unbiased estimator for β.

Weighted least squares 

A special case of GLS called weighted least squares (WLS) occurs when all the off-diagonal entries of Ω are 0.  This situation arises when the variances of the observed values are unequal (i.e. heteroscedasticity is present), but where no correlations exist among the observed variances.  The weight for unit i is proportional to the reciprocal of the variance of the response for unit i.

Feasible generalized least squares 

In FGLS, modeling proceeds in two stages: (1) the model is estimated by OLS or another consistent (but inefficient) estimator, and the residuals are used to build a consistent estimator of the errors covariance matrix (to do so, one often needs to examine the model adding additional constraints, for example if the errors follow a time series process, a statistician generally needs some theoretical assumptions on this process to ensure that a consistent estimator is available); and (2) using the consistent estimator of the covariance matrix of the errors, one can implement GLS ideas.

Whereas GLS is more efficient than OLS under heteroscedasticity (also spelled heteroskedasticity) or autocorrelation, this is not true for FGLS. The feasible estimator is, provided the errors covariance matrix is consistently estimated, asymptotically more efficient, but for a small or medium size sample, it can be actually less efficient than OLS. This is why some authors prefer to use OLS, and reformulate their inferences by simply considering an alternative estimator for the variance of the estimator robust to heteroscedasticity or serial autocorrelation.
But for large samples FGLS is preferred over OLS under heteroskedasticity or serial correlation. A cautionary note is that the FGLS estimator is not always consistent. One case in which FGLS might be inconsistent is if there are individual specific fixed effects.

In general this estimator has different properties than GLS. For large samples (i.e., asymptotically) all properties are (under appropriate conditions) common with respect to GLS, but for finite samples the properties of FGLS estimators are unknown: they vary dramatically with each particular model, and as a general rule their exact distributions cannot be derived analytically. For finite samples, FGLS may be even less efficient than OLS in some cases. Thus, while GLS can be made feasible, it is not always wise to apply this method when the sample is small.
A method sometimes used to improve the accuracy of the estimators in finite samples is to iterate, i.e. taking the residuals from FGLS to update the errors covariance estimator, and then updating the FGLS estimation, applying the same idea iteratively until the estimators vary less than some tolerance. But this method does not necessarily improve the efficiency of the estimator very much if the original sample was small.
A reasonable option when samples are not too large is to apply OLS, but throwing away the classical variance estimator

(which is inconsistent in this framework) and using a HAC (Heteroskedasticity and Autocorrelation Consistent) estimator. For example, in autocorrelation context we can use the Bartlett estimator (often known as Newey–West estimator estimator since these authors popularized the use of this estimator among econometricians in their 1987 Econometrica article), and in heteroskedastic context we can use the Eicker–White estimator. This approach is much safer, and it is the appropriate path to take unless the sample is large, and "large" is sometimes a slippery issue (e.g. if the errors distribution is asymmetric the required sample would be much larger).

The ordinary least squares (OLS) estimator is calculated as usual by

and estimates of the residuals  are constructed.

For simplicity consider the model for heteroscedastic and not autocorrelated errors. Assume that the variance-covariance matrix  of the error vector is diagonal, or equivalently that errors from distinct observations are uncorrelated. Then each diagonal entry may be estimated by the fitted residuals   so  may be constructed by

It is important to notice that the squared residuals cannot be used in the previous expression; we need an estimator of the errors variances. To do so, we can use a parametric heteroskedasticity model, or a nonparametric estimator. Once this step is fulfilled, we can proceed:

Estimate  using  using weighted least squares

The procedure can be iterated. The first iteration is given by

This estimation of  can be iterated to convergence.

Under regularity conditions any of the FGLS estimator (or that of any of its iterations, if we iterate a finite number of times) is asymptotically distributed as

 

where n is the sample size and

here p-lim means limit in probability

See also 
 Confidence region
 Effective degrees of freedom
 Prais–Winsten estimation

References

Further reading 
 
 
  
 

Least squares
Estimation methods
Regression with time series structure